The 2016–17 Indian Women's League preliminary round was the qualifying round that decided the two teams out of the participating ten that to enter the final round of the Indian Women's League. The ten teams were split into two groups of five each and the top-ranked team from each group qualified for the final rounds. Eastern Sporting Union and Rising Student Club qualified for the final round.

Teams

Group A

Table

Fixtures and results

Group B

Table

Fixtures and results

Goalscorers
11 Goals
 Sanju Yadav (Alakhpura)

10 Goals
 Pyari Xaxa (Rising Students)

8 Goals
 Deepika (Alakhpura)

5 Goals
 Kavita (Alakhpura)
 Indumathi Kathiresan (Jeppiaar Institute)

4 Goals

 Anju Tamang (Bodyline)
 Manpreet (Quartz)
 Bala (Eastern Sporting Union)
 Dangmei Grace (KRYPHSA)
 K. Sumithra (Jeppiaar Institute)

3 Goals

 Kamala Devi (Eastern Sporting Union)
 Premi Devi (Eastern Sporting Union)
 Mandakini (Eastern Sporting Union)
 Oinam Bembem Devi (Eastern Sporting Union)
 Sangita Basfore (Rising Students)

2 Goals

 Mamata (Alakhpura)
 Sasmita Malik (Rising Students)
 Pinki (Rising Students)
 Karen Paisley (Bodyline)
 Rhea (Bodyline)
 Mamta (Quartz)
 Bindyarani (KRYPHSA)
 Roshni (KRYPHSA)
 Pradeepa (Jeppiaar Institute)
 Nandhini (Jeppiaar Institute)

1 Goals

 Sandhya (Jeppiaar Institute)
 M Nandhini (Jeppiaar Institute)
 Umapati (Eastern Sporting Union)
 Parameshwari (Eastern Sporting Union)
 Manda Devi (Eastern Sporting Union)
 Haokip (Eastern Sporting Union)
 Prameshwori (Eastern Sporting Union)
 Nisha (Alakhpura)
 Ngoubi Devi (Rising Students)
 Articlave Anima (Rising Students)
 Manisha Panna (Rising Students)
 Jabamani Tudu (Rising Students)
 Aditi Shetty (Bodyline)
 Reshmi (Quartz)
 Tara (Quartz)
 Muthu Selvi (Jeppiaar Institute)
 Juki (Jeppiaar Institute)
 Varalakshmi (Jeppiaar Institute)
 Amsavalli (Jeppiaar Institute)

References

External links
 Fixtures and results

Indian Women's League
2016–17 in Indian football leagues
2016–17 domestic women's association football leagues